Jörg Sauerland (born 24 December 1976) is a German former professional footballer who played as a defender.

Honours
 Intercontinental Cup: 1997

References

External links

1976 births
Living people
German footballers
Association football defenders
Bundesliga players
Borussia Dortmund II players
Borussia Dortmund players
KFC Uerdingen 05 players
Kickers Emden players
Footballers from Dortmund